Hubbard High School is a public high school in Hubbard, Ohio, United States. It is the only high school in the Hubbard Exempted Village School District. Sports teams are called the Eagles, and they compete in the Ohio High School Athletic Association as a member of the Northeast 8 Athletic Conference.

The school, located at 350 Hall Ave, serves students in grades 9 through 12 from Hubbard, Ohio, but also a number of students from Youngstown and other surrounding communities through the Open Enrollment program. Built in 2013, Hubbard has one of the newer campuses in the area.

Athletics
Sports offered at Hubbard High School include; Cheerleading, Cross Country, Football, Golf, Soccer, Volleyball, Basketball, Bowling, Swimming, Wrestling, Baseball, Softball, and Track.

OHSAA State Championships

 Boys Golf – 1971

References

External links
 District Website

High schools in Trumbull County, Ohio
Public high schools in Ohio